Though in general, each business may decide with whom they wish to transact, there are some situations when a refusal to deal may be considered an unlawful anti-competitive practice, if it prevents or reduces competition in a market. The unlawful behaviour may involve two or more companies refusing to use, buy from or otherwise deal with a person or business, such as a competitor, for the purpose of inflicting some economic loss on the target or otherwise force them out of the market. A refusal to deal (also known as a group boycott) is forbidden in some countries which have restricted market economies, though the actual acts or situations which may constitute such unacceptable behaviour may vary significantly between jurisdictions.

Definitions
Australian Competition & Consumer Commission defines the refusal to deal as:

The Indian Competition Act 2002 defines the refusal to deal as:

See also
 ACCC v Cabcharge Australia Ltd
 Commercial law
 Competition law
 Essential facilities doctrine
 Exclusive dealing
 Market economy

References

Anti-competitive practices
Competition law
Business law